The 2002–03 Toto Cup Al was the 19th season of the third most important football tournament in Israel since its introduction. This was the 4th edition to be played with clubs of both Israeli Permier League and Liga Leumit clubs.

The competition began on 9 August 2002 and ended on 20 May 2003, with Maccabi Haifa beating Hapoel Tel Aviv 2–0 in the final.

Format change
The 24 Israeli Permier League and Liga Leumit clubs were divided into four groups, each with six clubs, with the top two teams advancing to the quarter-finals.

Group stage
The matches were played from 9 August 2002 to 27 January 2003.

Group A

Group B

Group C

Group D
On 29 August 2002 Hakoah Ramat Gan was demoted to Liga Artzit and was replaced by Hapoel Tzafririm Holon.  As a result, the two matches played by Hakoah Ramat Gan before the club was demoted were annulled.

Knockout rounds

Quarter-finals

Semifinals

Final

See also
 2002–03 Toto Cup Artzit

References

External links
 Israel Cups 2002/03 RSSSF
 Toto Cup Israeli Football 
 Toto Cup 02-03 One.co.il 

Al
Toto Cup Al
Toto Cup Al